Haemulinae is a subfamily of the Haemulidae and consists of the genera of that family which are regarded as being of New World origin, although they are now widespread. The subfamily is distinguished from the Plectorhynchinae by having a short dorsal fin which contains 13-16 soft rays, as opposed to the long dorsal fin with 17-26 soft rays of the subfamily Plectorhynchinae.

Genera
The following genera are included in the Haemulinae:

 Anisotremus Gill 1861
 Boridia Cuvier, 1830
 Brachydeuterus Gill, 1862
 Conodon Cuvier, 1830
 Emmelichthyops Schultz, 1945
 Haemulon Cuvier, 1829
 Haemulopsis Steindachner, 1869
 Isacia Jordan & Fesler, 1893
 Microlepidotus Gill, 1862
 Orthopristis Girard, 1858
 Parakuhlia Pellegrin, 1913
 Pomadasys Lacépède, 1802
 Xenichthys Gill, 1862
 Xenistius Jordan & Gilbert, 1883
 Xenocys  Jordan & Bollman, 1890

The genus Brachygenys is recognised by some authorities as Haemulon was determined to be paraphyletic in molecular studies which showed Haemulon chrysargyreum clustered with Xenistius californianus. The genus also includes the other species in Xenistius and Xenocys. Similarly, these studies also resolved Pomadasys as paraphyletic and the genera Rhencus and Rhonciscus were revived to solve this paraphyly, with the eastern Pacific species P. macracanthus and P. panamensis being placed in Rhencus while Rhonciscus contains the eastern Pacific species P. bayanus and the western Atlantic species P. crocro. These changes are recognised by Catalog of Fishes but not yet by Fishbase. In addition, according to these studies, Anisotremus moricandi makes Anisotremus paraphyletic if included and has been placed in the monotypic genus Paranisotremus.

Catalog of Fishes lists the following genera as valid within the Haemulinae:

 Anisotremus Gill 1861
 Boridia Cuvier, 1830
 Brachydeuterus Gill, 1862
 Brachygenys Poey, 1868
 Conodon Cuvier, 1830
 Emmelichthyops Schultz, 1945
 Haemulon Cuvier, 1829
 Haemulopsis Steindachner, 1869
 Isacia Jordan & Fesler, 1893
 Microlepidotus Gill, 1862
 Orthopristis Girard, 1858
 Parakuhlia Pellegrin, 1913
 Paranisotremus Tavera, Acero & Wainwright, 2018
 Pomadasys Lacépède, 1802
 Rhencus Jordan & Evermann, 1896
 Rhonciscus Jordan & Evermann, 1896
 Xenichthys Gill, 1862

Other authorities place the genus Genyatremus within the Haemulinae, although both Fishbase and Catalog of Fishes put this genus in the other Haemulid subfamily Plectorhinchinae.

References

Haemulidae